Potassium bromate (KBrO3), is a bromate of potassium and takes the form of white crystals or powder. It is a strong oxidizing agent.

Preparation
Potassium bromate is produced when bromine is passed through a hot solution of potassium hydroxide. This first forms unstable potassium hypobromite, which quickly disproportionates into bromide and bromate:
 3BrO−(aq) →  2Br−(aq) + (aq)
Electrolysis of potassium bromide solutions will also give bromate. Both processes are analogous to those used in the production of chlorates.

Potassium bromate is readily separated from the potassium bromide present in both methods owing to its much lower solubility; when a solution containing potassium bromate and bromide is cooled to 0°C, nearly all bromate will precipitate, while nearly all of the bromide will stay in solution.

Uses in baking
Potassium bromate is typically used in the United States as a flour improver (E number E924). It acts to strengthen the dough and to allow higher rising. It is an oxidizing agent, and under the right conditions will be completely reduced to bromide in the baking process. However, if too much is added, or if the bread is not baked long enough or not at a high enough temperature, then a residual amount will remain, which may be harmful if consumed.

Potassium bromate might also be used in the production of malt barley, for which application the U.S. Food and Drug Administration (FDA) has prescribed certain safety conditions, including labeling standards for the finished malt barley product. It is a very powerful oxidizer (E° = 1.5 volts, comparable to potassium permanganate).

Regulation
Potassium bromate is classified as a category 2B carcinogen by the International Agency for Research on Cancer (IARC). Potassium bromate has been banned from food products in the European Union, Argentina, Brazil, Canada, Nigeria, South Korea, and Peru. It was banned in Sri Lanka in 2001, China in 2005, and India in 2016, but it is allowed in the United States. The FDA allowed the use of bromate before the Delaney clause of the Food, Drug, and Cosmetic Act—which bans potentially carcinogenic substances—went into effect in 1958. However, since 1991 the FDA has urged bakers to voluntarily stop using it. In California, a warning label is required when bromated flour is used. Japanese baked goods manufacturers stopped using potassium bromate voluntarily in 1980; however, Yamazaki Baking resumed its use in 2005, claiming they had new production methods to reduce the amount of the chemical which remained in the final product.

References

Bromates
Potassium compounds
IARC Group 2B carcinogens
Oxidizing agents
Food additives